Moksob is a rural locality (a selo) in Khasavyurtovsky District, Republic of Dagestan, Russia. The population was 667 as of 2010. There are 10 streets.

Geography 
Moksob is located 33 km north of Khasavyurt (the district's administrative centre) by road. Novoselskoye is the nearest rural locality.

References 

Rural localities in Khasavyurtovsky District